Debochitsa is a very sparsely populated and dispersed village in Blagoevgrad Municipality, in Blagoevgrad Province, Bulgaria. It is an isolated mountainous settlement in Vlahina mountain, bordering with North Macedonia.

References

Villages in Blagoevgrad Province